Supermodel is a 2015 film directed by Shawn Baker and Datari Turner and starring Tyson Beckford, Sessilee Lopez, Tatyana Ali, Fat Joe and Roger Guenveur Smith. It was produced by Datari Turner.

Notes

External links
 
 

2015 films
American drama films
Films about fashion
2015 drama films
2010s English-language films
2010s American films